James Mundell Lowe (April 21, 1922 – December 2, 2017) was an American jazz guitarist who worked often in radio, television, and film, and as a session musician.

He produced film and TV scores in the 1970s, such as the Billy Jack soundtrack and music for Starsky and Hutch, and worked with André Previn's Trio in the 1990s.

Career
The son of a Baptist minister, Lowe grew up on a farm in Shady Grove, Mississippi, near Laurel. He started playing guitar when he was eight years old, with his father and sister acting as his first teachers. When he was thirteen, he began running away from home to play in bands. Occasionally his father would find him, bring him home, and warn him about the dangers of whiskey. At sixteen, Lowe worked in Nashville on the Grand Ole Opry radio program. He was a member of the Jan Savitt orchestra before serving in the military during World War II.

At basic training, he became friends with John Hammond, who organized weekend jam sessions. He performed in an Army dance band while in Guadalcanal. After his discharge, he called Hammond, looking for work, and Hammond sent him to Ray McKinley. He spent two years with McKinley's big band in New York City. He joined the Benny Goodman orchestra, then worked intermittently for the next few years at Café Society and other clubs in New York.

In 1950, he was hired by NBC as a staff musician. He and Ed Shaughnessy were members of the Today Show band for over ten years. Lowe acted in an episode of the Armstrong Circle Theatre television show that included Walter Matthau and live music by Doc Severinsen.

On the weekends he played jazz, sometimes getting permission from NBC to leave for six-month periods. In the jazz world he played with Jimmy Dorsey and Tommy Dorsey, Bill Evans, Billie Holiday, Red Norvo, Charles Mingus, Charlie Parker, Sauter-Finegan Orchestra, and Lester Young. He composed and arranged for NBC. He was responsible for introducing pianist Bill Evans to record producer Orrin Keepnews, resulting in Evans's first recordings as a leader.

In 1965 he moved to Los Angeles and worked for NBC as a staff guitarist, composer, and arranger. He wrote music for the TV shows Hawaii Five-O, Starsky & Hutch, and The Wild Wild West, and the movies Satan in High Heels (1962), A Time for Killing (1967), Billy Jack (1971), Everything You Always Wanted to Know About Sex* (*But Were Afraid to Ask) (1972), Sidewinder 1 (1977) and Tarantulas: The Deadly Cargo (1977). He recorded with Carmen McRae and Sarah Vaughan. During the 1980s, he worked with André Previn, Tete Montoliu, and the Great Guitars. He was a teacher at the Guitar Institute of Technology and the Grove School of Music. For several years, he was music director of the Monterey Jazz Festival.

During his career, he worked with Benny Carter, Miles Davis, Ella Fitzgerald, Johnny Hodges, Rahsaan Roland Kirk, Lee Konitz, Peggy Lee, Fats Navarro, Shirley Scott, Dinah Washington, and Ben Webster. In the later decades of his life he collaborated often with flautist Holly Hoffman. At the age of 93, he released the album Poor Butterfly.

Lowe was married to singer Betty Bennett, his third wife, for 42 years. In his last years, the couple lived in San Diego. He died on December 2, 2017, at the age of 95.

Discography

As leader
 The Mundell Lowe Quartet (Riverside, 1955)
 Guitar Moods (Riverside, 1956)
 New Music of Alec Wilder (Riverside, 1956)
 A Grand Night for Swinging (Riverside, 1957)
 Porgy & Bess (RCA Camden, 1959)
 TV Action Jazz! (RCA Camden, 1959)
 Themes from Mr. Lucky, The Untouchables and Other TV Action Jazz (RCA Camden, 1960)
 Satan in High Heels (Charlie Parker, 1961)/Blues for a Stripper (Charlie Parker, 1962)
 California Guitar (Famous Door, 1973)
 Guitar Player (Dobre, 1977)
 Sweet 'n' Lovely 1 (Fresh Sound, 1991)
 Sweet 'n' Lovely 2 (Fresh Sound, 1991)

As sideman
With Ruby Braff
 Holiday in Braff (Bethlehem, 1955)
 Easy Now (RCA Victor, 1959)
 You're Getting to Be a Habit with Me (Stere-o-Craft, 1959)

With Chris Connor
 Chris Connor Sings the George Gershwin Almanac of Song (Atlantic, 1957)
 I Miss You So (Atlantic, 1957)
 Chris Craft (Atlantic, 1958)
 Witchcraft (Atlantic, 1959)
 At the Village Gate (FM, 1963)

With Carmen McRae
 Carmen McRae (Bethlehem, 1954)
 Blue Moon (Decca, 1956)
 Birds of a Feather (Decca, 1958)
 Carmen McRae Sings Lover Man and Other Billie Holiday Classics (Philips, 1962)

With André Previn
 Uptown (Telarc, 1990)
 Old Friends (Telarc, 1992)
 What Headphones? (Angel, 1993)
 André Previn and Friends Play Show Boat (Deutsche Grammophon, 1995)
 Jazz at the Musikverein (Verve, 1997)

With Felicia Sanders
 That Certain Feeling (Decca, 1958)
 I Wish You Love (Time, 1960)
 Felicia Sanders (Time, 1964)

With Tony Scott
 Both Sides of Tony Scott (RCA Victor, 1956)
 The Touch of Tony Scott (RCA Victor, 1956)
 Gypsy (Fresh Sound, 1987)

With others
 Steve Allen, ...and All That Jazz (Dot, 1959)
 Steve Allen, Steve Allen at the Roundtable (Roulette, 1959)
 Louie Bellson, Louie Rides Again! (Percussion Power, 1974)
 Betty Bennett, The Song Is You (Fresh Sound, 1992)
 Tony Bennett, My Heart Sings (Columbia, 1961)
 Tony Bennett, Who Can I Turn To (CBS, 1965)
 Bill Berry, Shortcake (Concord Jazz, 1994)
 Will Bradley & Johnny Guarnieri, Big Band Boogie (RCA, 1974)
 Les Brown, Digital Swing (Fantasy, 1987)
 Ruth Brown, Late Date with Ruth Brown (Atlantic, 1959)
 Benny Carter, Live and Well in Japan! (Pablo, 1978)
 Benny Carter, Elegy in Blue (MusicMasters, 1994)
 Russ Case, Dances Wild (Vik, 1957)
 Cher, Bittersweet White Light (MCA, 1973)
 Al Cohn, Son of Drum Suite (RCA Victor, 1961)
 Betty Comden, Richard Lewine, Remember These (Ava, 1963)
 Randy Crawford, Everything Must Change (Warner Bros., 1976)
 Jackie Davis, Most Happy Hammond (Capitol, 1958)
 Wild Bill Davis & Johnny Hodges, Con-Soul and Sax (RCA Victor, 1965)
 Wild Bill Davis, Free Frantic and Funky (RCA Victor, 1965)
 Sammy Davis Jr., Mood to Be Wooed (Decca, 1958)
 Sammy Davis Jr., Try a Little Tenderness (Decca, 1965)
 Blossom Dearie, Once Upon a Summertime (Verve, 1958)
 Don Elliott, Music for the Sensational Sixties (Design, 1958)
 Don Elliott, Counterpoint for Six Valves (Riverside, 1959)
 Ella Fitzgerald, Rhythm Is My Business (Verve, 1962)
 Jimmy Forrest, Soul Street (New Jazz, 1964)
 Benny Goodman, The New Benny Goodman Sextet (Philips, 1954)
 Marty Gold, Swingin' West (RCA Victor, 1960)
 Eydie Gorme, Blame It On the Bossa Nova (Columbia, 1963)
 Johnny Guarnieri, The Duke Again (Coral, 1957)
 Donna Hightower, Take One! (Capitol, 1959)
 Johnny Hodges & Wild Bill Davis, Blue Rabbit (Verve, 1964)
 Kenyon Hopkins & Creed Taylor, The Sound of New York (ABC-Paramount, 1959)
 Quincy Jones, Quincy Jones Explores the Music of Henry Mancini (Mercury, 1964)
 Deane Kincaide, The Solid South (Everest, 1959)
 Morgana King, With a Taste of Honey (Mainstream, 1964)
 Al Klink, Progressive Jazz (Grand Award, 1956)
 Barry Manilow, 2:00 AM Paradise Cafe (Arista, 1984)
 Herbie Mann, Herbie Mann Plays The Roar of the Greasepaint – The Smell of the Crowd  (Atlantic, 1965)
 Marty Manning, The Twilight Zone (Columbia, 1961)
 Ray McKinley's Orchestra Arr. by Eddie Sauter, Borderline (Savoy, 1955)
 Helen Merrill, American Country Songs (Atco, 1959)
 Hugo Montenegro, Bongos and Brass (Time, 1960)
 Joe Mooney, The Happiness of Joe Mooney (Columbia, 1965)
 Charlie Parker, Parker Plus Strings (Charlie Parker, 1983)
 Michael Parks, You Don't Know Me (First American, 1981)
 Arthur Prysock, Arthur Prysock Sings Only for You (Old Town, 1962)
 Johnnie Ray, Til Morning (Columbia, 1958)
 Chita Rivera, And Now I Sing! (Seeco, 1961)
 Spike Robinson, Reminiscin (Capri, 1992)
 Sauter-Finegan Orchestra, Straight Down the Middle (RCA Victor, 1958)
 Lalo Schifrin, New Fantasy (Verve, 1964)
 Jimmy Scott, Very Truly Yours (Savoy, 1984)
 Shirley Scott, For Members Only (Impulse!, 1964)
 Jack Sheldon, Singular (Beez, 1980)
 Jack Sheldon, Playin' It Straight (M&K, 1981)
 Hymie Shertzer, All the King's Saxes (Disneyland, 1958)
 George Siravo, Seductive Strings by Siravo (Time, 1961)
 Rex Stewart & Peanuts Hucko, Dedicated Jazz (Jazztone, 1956)
 Ted Straeter, Ted Straeter's New York (Atlantic, 1955)
 Creed Taylor, Shock Music in Hi-Fi (ABC-Paramount, 1958)
 Creed Taylor, Ping Pang Pong the Swinging Ball (ABC-Paramount, 1960)
 Kiri Te Kanawa, Kiri Sidetracks (Philips, 1992)
 Cal Tjader, Gozame! Pero Ya... (Concord Jazz Picante, 1980)
 Sarah Vaughan, Sarah Vaughan in Hi-Fi (Columbia, 1955)
 Sarah Vaughan, After Hours (Roulette, 1961)
 Patty Weaver, Feelings (SE, 1976)
 Patty Weaver, Patty Weaver Sings "As Time Goes By" (SE, 1976)
 Ben Webster, The Soul of Ben Webster (Verve, 1960)
 Lee Wiley, A Touch of the Blues (RCA Victor, 1958)

References

External links 
 NAMM Oral History Interview April 8, 2002
 
 

1922 births
2017 deaths
American jazz guitarists
Guitarists from Mississippi
People from Smith County, Mississippi
Riverside Records artists
RCA Records artists
20th-century American guitarists
Jazz musicians from Mississippi
American military personnel of World War II